Ubong Williams is a footballer who plays as a utility defender and midfielder for Abia Warriors. He previously played for Delta Force.
Ubong Williams Edet started his football career from his youth team Karamone F.C. which later went on a season loan to Delta Force F.C. in the Nigeria National League before joining  Abia Warriors from his parental team Karamone F.C.

References

Living people
Year of birth missing (living people)
Association football defenders
Nigeria Professional Football League players
Karamone F.C. players
Nigerian footballers
Abia Warriors F.C. players